The Shadow Ministry of Anthony Albanese was the Opposition Australian Labor Party Shadow Ministry between 2 June 2019 and 23 May 2022, during the Morrison Government. The Shadow Ministry was established by Anthony Albanese following his election as Leader of the Australian Labor Party (ALP) and Leader of the Opposition on 30 May 2019. Following Labor's victory at the 2022 Australian federal election on 21 May 2022, the Shadow Ministry was replaced by the Albanese Ministry.

The Shadow Ministry was the Opposition's alternative to the Second Morrison Ministry, which was sworn in on 29 May 2019. Its most senior members formed a "shadow Cabinet" to the official Cabinet of Australia led by Prime Minister Scott Morrison.

Each state's factions, including Left and Right, were allocated a quota of shadow ministers. The composition of the shadow ministry was determined by the state factions, but the Leader of the Opposition allocated portfolios and selected the shadow cabinet. The shadow ministry contains 30 members, including a shadow cabinet of 20 members, and there are also twelve shadow assistant ministers.

Final arrangement
The final shadow ministry was announced on 28 January 2021, two months after the resignation of Joel Fitzgibbon from the shadow cabinet.

Shadow cabinet

Outer shadow ministry

Assistant shadow ministers

Shadow Ministry (2019–2021)
Shadow Minister for Agriculture and Resources Joel Fitzgibbon resigned in November 2020. For a brief period until the January 2021 reshuffle, Ed Husic took over Fitzgibbon's portfolio.

Shadow Cabinet

Outer Shadow Ministry

Shadow Assistant Ministers

References

Anthony Albanese
Australian Labor Party
Albanese
Opposition of Australia